Ljubomir Fejsa (born 14 August 1988) is a Serbian professional footballer who plays for Partizan as a defensive midfielder.

From 2008–09 to 2016–17, Fejsa won ten consecutive league titles across three clubs – three with Partizan, three with Olympiacos and four with Benfica, winning both the Super League Greece and the Primeira Liga in the 2013–14 season.

Club career

Partizan
On 1 July 2008, it was announced that Fejsa signed for FK Partizan after the club had been interested in him for over a year. He signed a five-year contract and was given the number 5 shirt for Partizan. In the three seasons he spent in Partizan, Fejsa won three Serbian Championship Titles as well as two trophies in the Serbian Cup. In the 2008/09 season. and 2009/10. Fejsa was included in the ideal team of the domestic championship. In April 2010, in a friendly match between the national teams of Serbia and Japan (3:0), Fejsa injured his anterior cruciate ligaments, after which he spent more than a year out of the field, and he played again only at the end of the 2010/11 season.

Olympiacos
On 21 June 2011 Fejsa signed with Olympiacos with a transfer fee of €3 million and signed a three plus one-year contract. His first appearance was in a friendly 1–0 win against Galatasaray. He scored his first goal against Inter Milan during another friendly match. He showed good form at the beginning of 2011–12 season, and had impressive performances during the early stages of Champions League Groups. However, he was injured during training and missed the rest of the season.

During the 2012–13 season, when Leonardo Jardim was named the head coach of Olympiacos, Fejsa was regularly benched and barely made any appearance during the Portuguese coach stay at the club. In February 2013, when Leonardo Jardim was sacked by Olympiacos due to the crowds dismay because of the playing style of the team, coach Míchel was hired and he immediately made Fejsa one of the starters. He made decent appearances, despite being benched for most of the season and he was called back to Serbia national football team for the 2014 FIFA World Cup qualification.

Benfica
On 23 August 2013, Fejsa signed a five-year contract with Benfica for a reported fee of €4.5 million.

Fejsa made his debut on 19 September 2013 in a Champions League match against Anderlecht. He appear sporadically in the first half of the season, but with Nemanja Matić's transfer to Chelsea, he became the sole option to the position, appearing far more regularly, until an injury in early April 2014 sidelined him for the next months.

On 2 February 2015, Benfica registered Fejsa at the LPFP, enabling him to play the rest of the season. He returned to competition, debuting for the reserve team in Segunda Liga on 11 March. A month later, he returned to Benfica's first-team, as a substitute, and scored the fifth goal of the match against Académica (5–1) in Primeira Liga.

On 29 January 2020, he was loaned out to Spanish La Liga side Alavés until the end of the season.

Al-Ahli
Fejsa left Benfica on 24 September 2020, signing with Saudi Arabian club Al-Ahli for two seasons.

International career
Fejsa made his senior debut for the Serbia national team under the guidance of head coach Javier Clemente with a substitute appearance during the rescheduled UEFA Euro 2008 qualifier at home against Kazakhstan on 24 November 2007. He also made substitute appearances against Northern Ireland, Faroe Islands and Italy in the UEFA Euro 2012 qualifying.

Career statistics

Club

International

Honours
Partizan
Serbian SuperLiga: 2008–09, 2009–10, 2010–11
Serbian Cup: 2008–09, 2010–11
Olympiacos
Super League Greece: 2011–12, 2012–13, 2013–14
Greek Cup: 2011–12, 2012–13
Benfica
Primeira Liga: 2013–14, 2014–15, 2015–16, 2016–17, 2018–19
Taça de Portugal: 2013–14, 2016–17
Taça da Liga: 2013–14, 2014–15, 2015–16
Supertaça Cândido de Oliveira: 2016, 2017
UEFA Europa League runner-up: 2013–14

Individual
Serbian SuperLiga Team of the Season: 2008–09, 2009–10

References

External links

 Ljubomir Fejsa Stats at Utakmica.rs (archived)
 
 

1988 births
Living people
People from Vrbas, Serbia
Serbian footballers
Association football defenders
Association football midfielders
Association football utility players
Serbia under-21 international footballers
Serbia international footballers
Serbian people of Rusyn descent
Footballers at the 2008 Summer Olympics
Olympic footballers of Serbia
Serbian SuperLiga players
Super League Greece players
Primeira Liga players
Saudi Professional League players
Liga Portugal 2 players
La Liga players
FK Hajduk Kula players
FK Partizan players
Olympiacos F.C. players
S.L. Benfica footballers
S.L. Benfica B players
Deportivo Alavés players
Al-Ahli Saudi FC players
Serbian expatriate footballers
Expatriate footballers in Greece
Expatriate footballers in Portugal
Expatriate footballers in Spain
Expatriate footballers in Saudi Arabia
Serbian expatriate sportspeople in Greece
Serbian expatriate sportspeople in Portugal
Serbian expatriate sportspeople in Spain
Serbian expatriate sportspeople in Saudi Arabia